Pleurophorus is a genus of aphodiine dung beetles in the family Scarabaeidae. There are more than 30 described species in Pleurophorus.

Species
These 37 species belong to the genus Pleurophorus:

 Pleurophorus africanus Pittino, 1984
 Pleurophorus akamasicus Pittino & Miessen, 2007
 Pleurophorus anatolicus Petrovitz, 1961
 Pleurophorus apicipennis Reitter, 1892
 Pleurophorus arabicus Pittino & Mariani, 1986
 Pleurophorus banksi Pittino & Mariani, 1986
 Pleurophorus beccarii Pittino & Mariani, 1986
 Pleurophorus bengalensis Pittino & Mariani, 1986
 Pleurophorus besucheti Pittino & Mariani, 1986
 Pleurophorus caesus (Panzer, 1796)
 Pleurophorus cambeforti Pittino & Mariani, 1986
 Pleurophorus capicola Péringuey, 1901
 Pleurophorus cracens Motschulsky, 1863
 Pleurophorus dinajpurensis Pittino & Mariani, 1986
 Pleurophorus dubius C.Wanner
 Pleurophorus edithae Endrödi, 1973
 Pleurophorus elongatus Moore, 1861
 Pleurophorus formosanus Pittino & Mariani, 1986
 Pleurophorus impressicollis (Boheman, 1858)
 Pleurophorus laticollis Pittino & Mariani, 1986
 Pleurophorus ledouxi Pittino & Mariani, 1986
 Pleurophorus madagassus Pittino & Mariani, 1986
 Pleurophorus maghrebinicus Pittino & Mariani, 1986
 Pleurophorus mediterranicus Pittino & Mariani, 1986
 Pleurophorus micros (Bates, 1887)
 Pleurophorus natalensis
 Pleurophorus nepalensis Pittino & Mariani, 1986
 Pleurophorus opacus Reitter, 1892
 Pleurophorus pannonicus Petrovitz, 1961
 Pleurophorus parvulus (Chevrolat, 1864)
 Pleurophorus raffrayi Pittino & Mariani, 1986
 Pleurophorus schereri Pittino & Mariani, 1986
 Pleurophorus setosus Pittino & Mariani, 1986
 Pleurophorus thailandicus Pittino & Mariani, 1986
 Pleurophorus tonkinensis Balthasar, 1933
 Pleurophorus torretassoi Schatzmayer, 1930
 Pleurophorus villiersi Bordat, 1984

References

Further reading

External links

 

Scarabaeidae
Articles created by Qbugbot